Sylivainiotika is a village in Achaea, Greece, near the town of Akrata.

Recent archaeological discoveries have revealed that there was a civilization in the village even in the middle Neolithic era. A painted fruit stand was discovered in the region that was made during the 6th millennium BC. This finding is being exhibited in the Archaeological Museum of Aigio (about 35 km west of Sylivainiotika on the highway from Athens to Patras). More recent findings include a three handled amphorae and a necklace both made at about the 15th century BC.

References

Populated places in Achaea